Robert Bellamy Clifton FRS (13 March 1836 – 21 February 1921) was a British scientist.

Academic career

Clifton was educated at University College, London and St John's College, Cambridge where he studied under Sir George Stokes.
In 1860 he went to Owens College, Manchester as Professor of Natural Philosophy. In 1865 he was appointed Professor of experimental Natural Philosophy at Oxford University. While at Oxford he designed Clarendon Laboratory and gave research space to Charles Vernon Boys.
 

On 4 June 1868 he became a fellow of the Royal Society.
He was president of the Physical Society (now Institute of Physics) from 1882 until 1884. From 1868 until his retirement in 1915 he was a Fellow of Merton College, Oxford.

Family
Clifton's father was the clergyman Robert Cox Clifton. His daughter Catharine Edith was married to the surgeon Henry Souttar.

References

1836 births
1921 deaths
British physicists
British scientists
Burials in Oxfordshire
Presidents of the Physical Society
Alumni of University College London
Alumni of St John's College, Cambridge
Academics of the Victoria University of Manchester
Academics of the University of Oxford
Fellows of the Royal Society
Dr Lee's Professors of Experimental Philosophy
Fellows of Merton College, Oxford
Burials at Wolvercote Cemetery